Kasper Straube (also Kaspar or Caspar, also known as The Printer of the Turrecrematas) was a German 15th-century printer from  Bavaria.

He was active in Cracow between 1473 and 1477, decades before Johann Haller. His Latin almanac Calendarium cracoviense (Cracovian Calendar) of 1473 is regarded as the first work printed in Poland.

Other surviving printed works by Straube include: 
 Juan de Torquemada: Explanatio in Psalterium
 Franciscus de Platea: Opus restitutionum usurarum et excommunicationum
 Augustine of Hippo: Opuscula (de doctrina christiana, de praedestinatione sanctorum)

See also 
 History of printing in Poland
 Incunable
 Johannes Gutenberg
 Movable type
 Printing
 Global spread of the printing press
 Florian Ungler

References

External links 
 Kasper Straube 

German printers
Printers of incunabula
15th-century German businesspeople
Businesspeople from Bavaria
Medieval German merchants